Lake Tahoe is located in the Sierra Nevada of both California and Nevada. A list of notable mountains that surround the lake is shown below.

Peaks

References

Lake Tahoe
Lake Tahoe
Lake Tahoe peaks
Lake Tahoe
Lake Tahoe
Lake Tahoe peaks
Lake Tahoe peaks
Lake Tahoe